Ivan Lendl was the defending champion but lost in the semifinals to Stefan Edberg.

Boris Becker won in the final 7–6(7–4), 6–4, 6–4 against Edberg.

Seeds
All sixteen seeds received a bye to the second round.

  Stefan Edberg (final)
  Boris Becker (champion)
  Ivan Lendl (semifinals)
  Brad Gilbert (second round)
  Aaron Krickstein (second round)
  Michael Chang (third round)
  Richard Fromberg (second round)
  Richey Reneberg (quarterfinals)
  David Wheaton (quarterfinals)
  Wally Masur (third round)
  Carl-Uwe Steeb (second round)
  Derrick Rostagno (second round)
  Darren Cahill (second round)
  Jim Grabb (second round)
  Mark Kratzmann (third round)
  Kelly Evernden (third round)

Draw

Finals

Top half

Section 1

Section 2

Bottom half

Section 3

Section 4

External links
 1990 Australian Indoor Championships draw

Singles